Stupor Duck is a 1956 Warner Bros. Looney Tunes animated short directed by Robert McKimson. The short was released on July 7, 1956, and stars Daffy Duck in a Superman spoof. The voices were performed by Mel Blanc and Daws Butler.  Butler, who voiced the narrator and the newspaper editor, was uncredited. This was one of the first DC Comics based productions by Warner Bros. before the company bought out DC in 1969. This was also during the time where DC Comics was known as National Comics Publications.

Synopsis 
Daffy Duck is cast as Stupor Duck and his alter ego, Cluck Trent.  The cartoon begins as a parody of the opening to The Adventures of Superman, which, after introducing Stupor Duck as a "Strange being from another planet", shows Stupor Duck being:
"Faster than a bullet" (a cork fired from a toy pop gun)
"More powerful than a speeding locomotive" (a recycled clip from Hare Trigger)
"Able to leap the tallest building" (the depicted tall building called the "McKimson Associates" building [sic], with Stupor Duck's cape catching on the flagpole at the very top, causing Daffy to nearly choke)

After the parodied introduction, the film proceeds to the story:

Mild-mannered newspaper reporter Cluck Trent, taking a break from writing, overhears a conversation coming from his editor's office.  The one-sided conversation is from a villain on a "corny soap opera" the editor is watching on TV.  The unseen soap's villain calls himself "Aardvark Ratnik," a Russian-accented terrorist bent on world domination.  Ratnik supposedly threatens widespread destruction (though his demands are never heard); his first line, after a maniacal laugh, is "You cannot stop me, Mr. Newspaper Editor!", which leads Cluck to the erroneous conclusion that Ratnik actually exists, his threats are serious, and that stopping him is a job for Stupor Duck.  Cluck runs to the broom closet to change into his alter-ego (after an errant change into a witch's costume, and then a minor adjustment to Stupor Duck's shoulder pads) and begins his search for the non-existent antagonist. Stupor Duck flies through a closed window and then hits another building!

One by one, Stupor Duck spots "examples" of "Aardvark's" supposed work and, before tackling each one, bellowing his battle cry, "THIS is a job for STU-U-U-POR Duck!".  His search includes:

A skyscraper being destroyed. Stupor Duck pushes the building back upright, not knowing it was to be demolished and replaced with a new city hall; he is punched out by the site foreman ("Then the lights went out all over the world!").
A sinking ship, which was actually a submarine conducting war games. Stupor Duck pulls the sub back to the surface and is first shot by its deck gun; when he dares "Ratnik" to try that again, Stupor Duck is promptly blown up and sunk by one of the sub's torpedoes.
A dynamite charge at the base of a railroad trestle as a train runs over it.  It turned out to be a Warner Brothers location shoot.  Stupor Duck grabs the dynamite and heads skyward, and is blown up (off-screen) by the unknowing explosives expert.  The expert is abruptly showered with black feathers as the "S" shield from Stupor Duck's costume softly lands in his hand; a featherless and disgruntled Daffy walks up and grabs the shield saying, "I'll just relieve you of that, if you don't mind".
Lastly, Stupor Duck hears a siren while unknowingly flying over government testing grounds.  He spots what he believes to be an armed warhead, but is actually a government moon rocket.  Right after Stupor Duck lands on the nose cone to try to stop it, the rocket launches into space, leaving behind Stupor Duck's costume in its wake.

As the rocket hurtles skyward, two rock climbers see it and shout "Up there in the sky!  It's a bird!  It's a plane!  It's STU-U-UPOR Duck!"  The final shot is of the now-naked Daffy screaming, still clinging to the rocket for dear life at it streaks toward the moon.

Home media
VHS- The Stars of Space Jam: Daffy Duck
VHS- Looney Tunes Collectors Edition: Porky and Daffy
DVD- Looney Tunes Golden Collection: Volume 5, Disc 1
Also the first wish in Daffy Duck's Fantastic Island, except at the end, the rocket sends him back to the island, where he limps over to and inadvertently kicks the wishing well with the leg he was limping on.
DVD - Superman: The Ultimate Collection

References

External links 
 

1956 films
1950s animated superhero films
Looney Tunes shorts
Warner Bros. Cartoons animated short films
1956 animated films
1956 short films
Parodies of Superman
Superman in other media
American superhero comedy films
1950s Warner Bros. animated short films
Films scored by Carl Stalling
Daffy Duck films
Films directed by Robert McKimson
Films produced by Edward Selzer
Films about journalists
1950s English-language films